Nord-Flyg is a Swedish cargo and passenger charter airline based at Eskilstuna, Sweden.
 Formed in 1955 as an air taxi operator it was launch customer for a cargo conversion of the Bombardier Dash 8 Q400.

Fleet

Notes

External links
 Company website

Airlines established in 1955
Airlines of Sweden
Swedish companies established in 1955
Charter airlines
Companies based in Södermanland County